Otročiněves is a municipality and village in Beroun District in the Central Bohemian Region of the Czech Republic. It has about 500 inhabitants.

Twin towns – sister cities

Otročiněves is twinned with:
 Laragh, Ireland

References

Villages in the Beroun District